The order Ascaridida includes several families of parasitic roundworms with three "lips" on the anterior end. They were formerly placed in the subclass Rhabditia by some, but morphological and DNA sequence data rather unequivocally assign them to the Spiruria. The Oxyurida and Rhigonematida are occasionally placed in the Ascaridida as superfamily Oxyuroidea, but while they seem indeed to be Spiruria, they are not as close to Ascaris as such a treatment would place them.
These "worms" contain a number of important parasites of humans and domestic animals.

Important families include:
 The Anisakidae are also called the "marine mammal ascarids". The larvae of these worms cause anisakiasis when ingested by humans in raw or insufficiently cooked fish, but do not reproduce in humans.
 The Ascarididae include the giant intestinal roundworms (Ascaris spp.).
 The Cosmocercidae include taxa that parasitize certain amphibians.
 The Toxocaridae include parasites of canids, felids, and raccoons, but can unsuccessfully parasitize humans and cause visceral larva migrans.
 The Ascaridiidae include roundworms of birds.

These all belong in the superfamily Ascaridoidea.

References 

 
Nematode orders